Tauranga is a New Zealand parliamentary electorate, returning one Member of Parliament to the New Zealand House of Representatives. The current MP for Tauranga is Sam Uffindell of the National Party, who won the seat in the 2022 Tauranga by-election, following the resignation of the previous MP, Simon Bridges of the National Party.

Population centres
The previous electoral redistribution was undertaken in 1875 for the 1875–1876 election. In the six years since, New Zealand's European population had increased by 65%. In the 1881 electoral redistribution, the House of Representatives increased the number of European representatives to 91 (up from 84 since the 1875–76 election). The number of Māori electorates was held at four. The House further decided that electorates should not have more than one representative, which led to 35 new electorates being formed, including Tauranga, and two electorates that had previously been abolished to be recreated. This necessitated a major disruption to existing boundaries.

The electorate includes Tauranga, Mt Maunganui and Omanu Beach, but excluding Hairini, Maungatapu, Matapihi and Welcome Bay.

History
Tauranga electorate was created for the 1881 election, which determined the composition of the 8th Parliament.  Initially, it existed until the 1890 election and during that time, it was represented by four MPs.

The 1881 election was hotly contested. Four candidates were nominated: George Morris, who had previously represented the  electorate; George Vesey Stewart, then the owner of the Bay of Plenty Times; William Kelly, who had also previously represented the East Coast electorate; and Henry Thomas Rowe, a surveyor and commission agent. Rowe announced his retirement from the contest on 6 December three days out from election day, urging his supporters to vote for Stewart instead. The unofficial results were released the day after the election (Saturday, 10 December) and Morris had a majority of 13 votes over Stewart, with the official declaration to be made on 12 December. This was deferred until 14 December, with Morris ahead by 10 votes. Stewart stood for the Tauranga mayoralty a few months later and was elected the town's first mayor.

The resulting by-election on 22 May  was won by John Sheehan, who died on 12 June 1885. The second  by-election on 11 July was won by Lawrence Grace, who represented the electorate until the end of the term in 1887. The  was won by William Kelly, who represented the electorate until the end of the term in 1890, at which time the electorate was abolished.

The electorate was recreated in 1908. He became a member of the Reform Party when it formed itself in the following year. Herries represented the electorate until his death on 22 February 1923.

The resulting  by-election was won by Charles MacMillan, who also represented the Reform Party.

Walsh served for seven terms and retired in 1972.

Allen's death did not cause a by-election, as it occurred within six months of the next general election. The 1984 election was won by Winston Peters, who had previously represented the  electorate. In 1990 until March 1991, Peters was Minister of Māori Affairs, but he was sacked from Cabinet by Prime Minister Jim Bolger in October 1991 after repeatedly criticising his National Party leadership. Peters remained as a National backbencher, continuing to criticise the party. In late 1992, when the National Party was considering possible candidates for the elections in the following year, it was decided that Peters would not be allowed to seek renomination for the Tauranga electorate. Peters unsuccessfully challenged this decision in the High Court, and in early 1993, he chose to resign from the party and from Parliament. This prompted a by-election in Tauranga some months before the scheduled general election. Peters stood as an independent and won with over 90% of the vote, assisted by the major parties not standing candidates against him. Shortly before the 1993 election, Peters established New Zealand First and retained the Tauranga electorate.

Clarkson's defeat of Winston Peters was significant, as this resulted in New Zealand First losing its only electorate seat. The party still gained parliamentary representation by polling over the five percent threshold, however. Clarkson retired at the end of the parliamentary term.

Members of Parliament
Key

List MPs

Members of Parliament elected from party lists in elections where that person also unsuccessfully contested the Tauranga electorate. Unless otherwise stated, all MPs terms began and ended at general elections.

Election results

2022 by-election

2020 election

2017 election

2014 election

2011 election

Electorate (as at 26 November 2011): 48,133

2008 election

2005 election

2002 election

1999 election

1996 election

1993 election

1993 by-election

1990 election

1987 election

1984 election

1981 election

1978 election

1975 election

1972 election

1969 election

1966 election

1963 election

1960 election

1957 election

1954 election

1951 election

1949 election

1946 election

1943 election

1938 election

1935 election

1931 election

 
 
 
 
 

 

Table footnotes:

1928 election

 
 
 
 
 

 

Table footnotes:

1923 by-election

1919 election

1881 election

Table footnotes

References

Bibliography

External links
Electorate profile, Parliamentary Library

New Zealand electorates
Tauranga
1881 establishments in New Zealand
1908 establishments in New Zealand
1890 disestablishments in New Zealand
Politics of the Bay of Plenty Region